The Egmont Group (formerly The Gutenberghus Group) is a Danish media corporation founded and rooted in Copenhagen, Denmark. The business area of Egmont has traditionally been magazine publishing, but has over the years evolved to comprise mass media generally.

History and profile
The Egmont Group was founded by Egmont Harald Petersen in 1878, as a one-man printing business, but soon became a magazine business. It was originally called "P. Petersen, Printers", named after Petersen's mother, as he was still too young at the time to register his own company. The company was renamed Gutenberghus in 1914 (after the famous inventor of the printing press), a name it kept until 1992.

Since 1948 Gutenberghus, looking for new opportunities, sent its editor Dan Folke to Walt Disney Productions, and he managed to acquire a license for publishing comic magazines in Scandinavia. In 1948 the company started to publish a Donald Duck comic magazine in Sweden (as Kalle Anka & C:o) and Norway (as Donald Duck & C:o), in 1949 also in Denmark (as Anders And & C:o). This magazine features all the well known Disney characters, from Mickey Mouse to Little Hiawatha under license from Disney.

With the acquisition in 1963, of the Danish publisher Aschehoug, Egmont also entered the book market. From the late 1980s the Egmont Group used the close connection with Disney to expand their Scandinavian focus to a global focus, being the producer of Disney for the new Eastern European market, as well as for the Chinese market. In 1991, Egmont was co-founder of the Norwegian television channel TV 2, before buying it outright in 2012. In 1992, Egmont bought Nordisk Film. In 1998, Egmont acquired the children's book catalogue of Reed Elsevier.

In 2008, they acquired the minority stake in magazine publisher Hjemmet Mortensen which they did not already hold, from Orkla ASA.

Egmont has a number of local country branches: Australia, Bulgaria, China, Croatia, Czech Republic, Denmark, Estonia, Finland, Germany, Hungary, Latvia, Lithuania, Norway, Poland, Russia, South Africa, Sweden, Turkey, Ukraine and United Kingdom.

Egmont is one of Scandinavia's leading media groups producing weeklies, magazines, comics, books, educational materials, activity products, movies and TV programs. The media group also operates movie theatres and TV stations, and the Egmont name is behind interactive games, game consoles, music and a wide range of digital media. Egmont publishes media in more than 30 countries, has over 5,300 employees and generated revenue amounting to over €2 billion in 2021.

Egmont acquired Forma Publishing Group in October 2014. In January 2015, the company shut down its American publishing division.

On 1 May 2020, Egmont completed the sale of three of its publishers (Egmont Books UK, Egmont Poland, and Schneiderbuch Germany) to HarperCollins.

Group management
 Steffen Kragh - President and CEO
 Hans J. Carstensen - CFO
 Torsten Bjerre Rasmussen - Executive Vice President, Egmont and CEO for Egmont Publishing
 Allan Mathson Hansen - Executive Vice President, Egmont and President for Egmont Nordisk Film
 Olav T. Sandnes - CEO and Chief Editor of TV 2 in Norway

Egmont divisions
 Egmont Publishing
 Egmont Books
 Nordisk Film
 TV 2
Vimond Media Solutions

UK branch 
Egmont UK publishes books and magazines for children in the United Kingdom. It is the largest dedicated children's publisher in the UK. The Head Office is in London. In May 2020, the books division of Egmont UK was sold to HarperCollins. The new imprint changed its name to Farshore in February 2021.

Egmont Books

In 1998, Reed Elsevier sold Dean & Son, World Distributors, and the children's divisions of Heinemann, Methuen, Hamlyn and Mammoth to the Egmont Group.

Egmont UK's book list includes fiction novels, illustrated picture books, pop up and novelty books, fantasy adventures, annuals, colouring, activity and sticker books as well and Egmont's own Reading Ladder (for five- to nine-year-olds). Egmont also has a number of young adult fiction, award-winners, classics and epic tales.

The Fiction list includes work from such award-winning authors as Andy Stanton, Jim Smith (author), Michael Morpurgo, Lemony Snickett, Jamila Gavin and David Levithan. Electric Monkey is Egmont's dedicated Young Adult imprint and authors published include Elizabeth Acevedo, Michael Grant (author, born 1954), Andrew A. Smith, Tahereh Mafi and Holly Jackson.

The Picture Book list includes work from authors such as Julia Donaldson, Kristina Stephenson, Michael Morpurgo and John Dougherty (author). Classic stories published by Egmont UK include The Velveteen Rabbit, The Little Prince and The Wind in the Willows. Authors on the non-fiction Red Shed imprint include Chris Packham and Laura Coryton.

Illustrators who are published by Egmont include Helen Oxenbury, Shirley Hughes, Jim Field, Rob Biddulph, Steven Lenton, Alex T. Smith and Colin and Jacqui Hawkins.

The Brands & Licensing books list includes titles from the following brands:
 
Babar
Blue's Clues
Disney Princess
Dora the Explorer
Even Stevens
Fireman Sam
Flying Rhino Junior High
Franklin
Frozen (franchise)
In a Heartbeat
The Jersey
Life with Derek
Lizzie McGuire
Little People
Mr. Men & Little Miss':
Minecraft
My Little Pony
Naturally, Sadie
Pokémon
Power Rangers
Ready Set Learn
Roblox
Rubik's Cube
Ryan's World
Rupert Bear
Something Special (TV series)
Star Wars
Teletubbies
Thomas and Friends
Toy Story
The Adventures of Tintin
Winnie-the-Pooh
Wilbur
Willa's Wild Life

Egmont offers a range of Personalised books through their website.

The Dean imprint (Dean & Son) offers consumer-led, bespoke publishing direct to retailers.

Egmont Magazines

In 1991, Egmont purchased the Fleetway arm of IPC Media in the UK from a company owned by Robert Maxwell, and merged it with their existing comics publishing division, London Editions, and thus became Britain's largest comic book publisher. The resultant company, Fleetway Editions, was absorbed into the main Egmont brand by 2000, having largely divested itself of its original portfolio (such as 2000 AD) and continued with only reprint and licensed material titles (e.g. Sonic The Comic). The Fleetway archive comprises those comics characters first published by IPC subsidiaries on or after 1 January 1970, together with 26 specifically named characters first published in Buster before that date.  In August 2016, The IPC/Fleetway library was sold to Rebellion Developments, who had previously acquired 2000 AD.

Egmont Magazines currently publish titles including Toxic, Thomas and Friends, Disney Princess, Frozen, Minecraft, and Go Girl.

Egmont Foundation
Egmont is a commercial foundation with a charitable wing. The founder's last will and testament paved the way for Egmont's charitable work to support social, cultural and scientific causes. As a foundation, Egmont helps improve children's and young people's quality of life, donating more than 235 million Euros to social, cultural and health projects since 1920.

See also 
 List of UK children's book publishers

References

External links 

 Egmont Group

Publishing companies established in 1878
Mass media companies of Denmark
Magazine publishing companies of Denmark
Book publishing companies of Denmark
Comic book publishing companies of Denmark
Mass media companies based in Copenhagen
Danish companies established in 1878
Disney comics publishers
Companies based in Copenhagen Municipality